The Cottage Park Yacht Club is a private yacht club located in Winthrop, Massachusetts, on Boston Harbor.

Fleets 
One-Design racing fleets include N-10, Optimist, 420, Laser and Snipe Rhodes 19

Sailors 
The club holds two world championships: The 1963 Star World Championship, won by Joe Duplin and Francis Dolan, and the 2007 Snipe World Championship, won by Tomas Hornos and Enrique Quintero.

Regattas 
CPYC has hosted the Snipe North American Championship in 1999, 2008 and 2014, and the Western Hemisphere & Orient Championship in 2021.

References

External links 
 Official website

1902 establishments in Massachusetts
Sailing in Massachusetts 
Winthrop, Massachusetts
Yacht clubs in the United States
Sports venues in Suffolk County, Massachusetts